Seyqalvandan (also Romanized as Şeyqalvandān) is a village in Tulem Rural District, Tulem District, Sowme'eh Sara County, Gilan Province, Iran. At the 2006 census, its population was 615, in 168 families.

References 

Populated places in Sowme'eh Sara County